Stupendous Mountain is a  mountain summit located in British Columbia, Canada.

Description

Stupendous Mountain, also known as Mount Stupendous, is situated in the Coast Mountains, towering above the south side of Bella Coola Valley. Precipitation runoff and glacier meltwater from the mountain drains into tributaries of the Bella Coola River. Topographic relief is significant as the summit rises 2,540 meters (8,333 feet) above the river in four kilometers (2.5 miles). The peak can be seen from Highway 20.

History

Stupendous Mountain was described by Sir Alexander Mackenzie on 17 July 1793: "Before us appeared a stupendous mountain, whose snow-clad summit was lost in the clouds." A 1947 map confined the name Stupendous Mountain to the higher southern peak (2,697 m) on the massif; at the same time the northern peak was adopted as Table Mountain. The landform's toponym was officially adopted as "Stupendous Mountain" on November 1, 1979, by the Geographical Names Board of Canada and was shifted to the lower northern peak, while the name "Table Mountain" was rescinded. The mountain's Native American name is Chil-a-thlum-dinky.

The first ascent of the summit was made in 1937 by Don Munday, Phyllis Munday and their sixteen-year-old daughter, Edith.

Climate

Based on the Köppen climate classification, Stupendous Mountain is located in the marine west coast climate zone of western North America. Most weather fronts originate in the Pacific Ocean, and travel east toward the Coast Mountains where they are forced upward by the range (Orographic lift), causing them to drop their moisture in the form of rain or snowfall. As a result, the Coast Mountains experience high precipitation, especially during the winter months in the form of snowfall. Winter temperatures can drop below −20 °C with wind chill factors below −30 °C. This climate supports a small glacier on the northeast slope.

See also
 
 Geography of British Columbia

Gallery

References

External links
 Weather forecast: Stupendous Mountain

Pacific Ranges
Two-thousanders of British Columbia
Range 3 Coast Land District
Coast Mountains
Bella Coola Valley